Missis may refer to:

 Missis or Misis, the previous name of Yakapınar, which in the past was the place of the ancient city of Mopsuestia
 Missis, a dog from The Hundred and One Dalmatians

See also
Missus (disambiguation)